is a Dutch registered passenger and cargo roll-on/roll-off ship/cruiseferry, in service with P&O North Sea Ferries on the Hull - Rotterdam route. The cruiseferry was also featured in the video game Ship Simulator Extremes.

Description

Pride of Rotterdam can carry 1,370 passengers. She has  of lane capacity, and can carry 250 cars and 400 trailers. Cars are driven in through an entrance in the ship's side and stored separately from trailers, which are loaded from the rear.
Pride of Rotterdam can store 400 m3 of drinking water.

History

The ship's keel was laid on 1 March 1999. The ship was built as yard number 6065. She was originally to have been named , but this was changed to Pride of Rotterdam before her launch on 29 September 2000. Pride of Rotterdam was officially handed over to P&O North Sea Ferries on 12 April 2001 in Venice, Italy.  She was christened on 27 April 2001 by Queen Beatrix and entered service on 30 April 2001 on the Hull - Rotterdam route.

Pride of Rotterdam is owned by Hampton Shipping BV, managed by P&O North Sea Ferries and classed by Lloyd's Register. She is allocated the IMO Number 9208617, MMSI Number 244980000 and uses the callsign PBAJ. Her port of registry is Rotterdam.

Both Pride of Rotterdam and Pride of Hull are too wide to pass through the lock at Hull. Associated British Ports built a new terminal at Hull to accommodate the passengers using these two ferries. The Rotterdam Terminal was built at a cost of £14,300,000.

On 21 November 2005, to celebrate the 40th anniversary of the introduction of the Hull - Rotterdam route, Pride of Rotterdam sailed from Rotterdam to Hull with the Dutch band BZN performing on board. The return sailing on 22 November also saw BZN performing. On 3 December 2008, a crew member was lost overboard in the North Sea off the east coast of the United Kingdom. A search was initiated involving eight lifeboats and helicopters from RAF Leconfield and Wattisham. The search was called off but the missing crew member was not found.

Layout 
Pride of Rotterdam has 12 decks.

In popular culture 
The ship is featured in the VSTEP game Ship Simulator 2008 and Ship Simulator Extremes enabling gamers to sail the ship in a number of different environments around the world including the Solent and the Port of Rotterdam.

It also appears in the popular book Eddie Burns' Lethal List 2013.

Sister Ships
Pride of Rotterdam has one sister ship:

See also
Largest ferries of Europe

References

External links 
Current position of Pride of Rotterdam
Deck plans of Pride of Rotterdam

Ferries of the United Kingdom
Cruiseferries
2000 ships
Ships built by Fincantieri
Ships built in Venice
Merchant ships of the Netherlands
Merchant ships of the Bahamas
Ships of P&O Ferries